Piligrim (Pilgrim of Passau, Pilegrinus, Peregrinus) (died 20 May 991) was Bishop of Passau. Piligrim was ambitious, but also concerned with the Christianization of Hungary.

He was educated at the Benedictine Niederaltaich Abbey, and was made bishop in 971. To him are attributed some, if not all, of the Forgeries of Lorch. These are a series of documents, especially papal bulls of  Pope Symmachus, Pope Eugene II, Pope Leo VII, and Pope Agapetus II, fabricated to prove that Passau was a continuation of a former archdiocese of Lorch. By these he attempted to obtain from Benedict VI the elevation of Passau to an archdiocese, the re-erection of those dioceses in Pannonia and Mœsia which had been suffragans of Lorch, and the pallium for himself. There is extant an alleged Bull of Benedict VI granting Piligrim's demands; but this is also the work of Piligrim, possibly a document drawn up for the papal signature, which it never received.

Piligrim converted numerous pagans in Hungary. In the Nibelungenlied he is lauded as a contemporary of the heroes of that epic.

References

Dümmler, Piligrim von Passau und das Erzbisthum Lorch (Leipzig, 1854)
Berliner Sitzungsberichte (1898), 758-75
Uhlirz, Die Urkundenfälschung zu Passau im zehnten Jahrhundert in Mittheilungen des Instituts für österreichische Geschichtsforschung, III (Vienna, 1882), 177-228; IDEM, ibid., supplementary vol., II (1888), 548 sq.
Heuwieser, Sind die Bischöfe von Passau Nachfolger der Bischöfe von Lorch? in Theologisch-praktische Monats-Schrift, XXI (Passau, 1910), 13-23, 85-90
Mittermüller, War Bischof Piligrim von Passau ein Urkundenfälscher? in Der Katholik, XLVII (Mainz, 1867), 337-62.

Notes

External links

 

991 deaths
Roman Catholic bishops of Passau
Forgers
Year of birth unknown
10th-century bishops in Bavaria